Indiana's 13th congressional district was a congressional district for the United States House of Representatives in Indiana.  It was eliminated as a result of the 1930 Census. It was last represented by Samuel B. Pettengill who was redistricted into the 3rd District.

List of members representing the district

References 

 Congressional Biographical Directory of the United States 1774–present

13
Former congressional districts of the United States
1875 establishments in Indiana
1933 disestablishments in Indiana
Constituencies established in 1875
Constituencies disestablished in 1933